LCM may refer to:

Computing and mathematics
 Latent class model, a concept in statistics
 Least common multiple, a function of two integers
 Living Computer Museum
 Life Cycle Management, management of software applications in Virtual Machines or in Containers
 Logical Computing Machine, another name for a Turing machine

Schools
 Leeds College of Music, a music conservatoire in Leeds, England
 London College of Music, a music conservatoire in London, England

Transportation
 LCM (2), an American World War II boat
 Landing Craft Mechanized, boat for carrying vehicles
 Laboratory Cabin Modules, on the Chinese space station

Other uses
 Land change modeling, an analytical field of geography
Laser capture microdissection, use of a laser through a microscope to isolate and extract cells
 Lymphocytic choriomeningitis, a viral infection carried by rodents
 Letalski center Maribor, Slovenian flying club
 Liverpool Classical Monthly, an academic journal on classical antiquity
 London Canal Museum, a canal museum in London, England
 London City Mission, in Hoxton, east London, England
 Lower of cost or market, value

See also
 Lifecycle management (disambiguation)